The Noah "Bud" Ogle Place was a homestead located in the Great Smoky Mountains of Sevier County, in the U.S. state of Tennessee.  The homestead presently consists of a cabin, barn, and tub mill built by mountain farmer Noah "Bud" Ogle (1863–1913) in the late 19th century.  In 1977, the homestead was added to the National Register of Historic Places and is currently maintained by the Great Smoky Mountains National Park.

The surviving structures at the Noah Ogle Place are characteristic of a typical 19th-century Southern Appalachian mountain farm.  Ogle's cabin is a type known as a "saddlebag" cabin (two single-pen cabins joined by a common chimney), which was a relatively rare design in the region.  Ogle's barn is an excellent example of a four-pen barn, a design once common in the area, although this barn is the last remaining four-pen barn in the park.  Ogle's tub mill is the park's last surviving operational tub mill and one of the few operational tub mills in the region.  A later owner of the Ogle farm renamed the farm "Junglebrook," and the farm is thus sometimes referred to as the "Junglebrook Historic District."

Location

The Noah Ogle Place is situated near LeConte Creek (formerly known as Mill Creek) in the upper drainage of the West Fork of the Little Pigeon River. Gatlinburg lies opposite the park boundary to the north, Roaring Fork lies opposite the hills to the east, the Sugarlands lies opposite the hills to the west, and Mount Le Conte rises to the south. Cherokee Orchard Road (still occasionally referred to as Airport Road) connects the Noah Ogle Place to U.S. Route 441 in downtown Gatlinburg to the north and to the Roaring Fork Motor Nature Trail to the south.

History

Noah Ogle's great-grandparents, William Ogle (1756–1803) and his wife Martha Huskey (1756–1826), were the first Euro-American settlers in the Gatlinburg area, arriving in the early 19th century (their cabin still stands on the Arrowmont School campus in downtown  Gatlinburg). The Ogles' descendants quickly spread out into the adjacent river and creek valleys. These last  comprise the bulk of the Bud Ogle Farm historic district.

Ogle's cabin and outbuildings were built in the late 1880s and early 1890s.  The land was poor and rocky (the National Park Service later claimed it was "unsuitable" for farming), and Ogle mostly grew corn.  The land did include a sizeable apple orchard which grew multiple types of apples.  Ogle's relatives were allowed free use of his tub mill, while others were charged a small percentage of meal.  Excess corn and apples were shipped to markets in Knoxville.  Ogle's wife, Lucinda Bradley Ogle, was a local midwife.

Along with the surviving structures and typical mountain farm outbuildings, Ogle's farm included a so-called "weaner cabin."  A weaner cabin was typically a small cabin near the main house where the farmer's children could live for a brief period after marrying.  Several of Ogle's sons lived in the Ogle weaner cabin after their respective marriages.  The weaner cabin is no longer standing, although a pile of rubble remains from its foundation.

In the 1920s, several investors established a  commercial apple orchard and ornamental nursery known as "Cherokee Orchard" just south of the Ogle homestead.  When the Tennessee Park Commission began buying up property for the creation of the national park in the late 1920s, the owners of Cherokee Orchard threatened to fight a major appropriations for bill for the park's funding if their land was condemned.  The orchard's owners dropped their opposition in 1931 in exchange for a long lease on the property.

Historic structures

Noah Ogle cabin

The Noah Ogle cabin consists of two cabins sharing a single chimney, known as a "saddlebag" cabin. The cabins were built approximately five years apart, the second cabin being added as Ogle's family grew. The cabin's walls consist of hewn logs connected by half-dovetail notches, with six doors (one on the front and back wall of each cabin, and two next to the chimney to allow quick passage between the two buildings). Each cabin has a split-oak shingled roof, a sawn board floor, and hearths made of rubble. The cabin's windows were initially shuttered, but eventually replaced with glass. One cabin has a small window near the floor that allowed chickens to enter to escape predators. A covered porch spans both the front and back walls of both cabins.

Images of the cabin were also used by Sleepycabin (a group of web animators) as background images for Sleepycast, a comedy podcast where they would talk about personal experiences.

Ogle barn

The Ogle barn is the last remaining four-pen barn in the park.  It consists of four  pens, each one story with a loft, covered by a split-shingled roof.  Like the cabin, the barn's walls are constructed of hewn logs connected by half-dovetail notches.  The park service made numerous repairs to the barn in the 1960s.

Tub mill

Ogle's tub mill is the last of at least 13 tub mills once located along LeConte Creek. The walls consist of logs connected with saddle notches, and the floor consists of hewn puncheon logs. A vertical shaft beneath the millhouse connects the grindstones with a "tub wheel" turbine. An  hollowed-log flume diverts water from the creek to the turbine. The mill was restored to its operational condition in the 1960s.

See also

Tyson McCarter Place
Walker Sisters Place

References

External links

Great Smoky Mountains National Park

National Register of Historic Places in Great Smoky Mountains National Park
Houses in Sevier County, Tennessee
Historic districts on the National Register of Historic Places in Tennessee
Houses on the National Register of Historic Places in Tennessee
Gatlinburg, Tennessee
National Register of Historic Places in Sevier County, Tennessee